Fuxianospira gyrata is a Cambrian macroalgae found in the Chengjiang lagerstatte. Preserved in clustered, helicoid groups, the filaments are threadlike, plain and without branches. Brown and smooth in appearance, these structural characteristics display a resemblance to modern brown algae. A limited amount of algae species have been discovered in the Chengjiang biota, suggesting that diversity within the general algae population may have been sparse. It is thought that the macroalgae could be the most basic component of the Chengjiang biota food chain.

It is also theorised that Fuxianospira gyrata, among other Chengjiang algae, is actually a coprolite.

References 

Heterokonts
Cambrian species